Rianne Monique Letschert (born 13 September 1976) is a Dutch law scholar. Since November 2021 she has been president of Maastricht University. Previously Letschert was professor of victimology and international law at Tilburg University between March 2011 and September 2016. From September 2016 until 1 February 2022 she was rector of Maastricht University.

Career
Letschert was born in Doetinchem on 13 September 1976. She moved at an early age to Stiphout in the municipality of Helmond. In Helmond she attended high school. Letschert studied law at Tilburg University, the University of Amsterdam and the University of Montpellier. She obtained her PhD at Tilburg University with a thesis titled The impact of minority rights mechanisms (2005), dealing with competing international organisations making policy on national minorities.

In 2011 Letschert was appointed as professor to the new chair of victimology and international law at Tilburg University. Several years later Letschert contemplated leaving academics. In May 2015 she was awarded an 800,000 Euro grant by the Netherlands Organisation for Scientific Research and decided to continue. Her research focused on the impact of international tribunals on societies and individuals that have been confronted with human rights violations and international crimes. Apart from her position as professor she served as director of the International Victimology Institute Tilburg (INTERVICT). In 2016 Letschert was asked to become dean of the Law faculty of Tilburg University. However, on 1 September 2016 she was appointed as rector of Maastricht University.

Letschert joined the De Jonge Akademie (Young Academy) of the Royal Netherlands Academy of Arts and Sciences in 2012. In April 2015 she became chairperson. Due to her appointment as rector magnificus of Maastricht University she was succeeded as chairperson by Rens Vliegenthart in June 2016. Letschert was a Schermer Fellow at the Netherlands Institute for Advanced Study in the period between February and June 2016.

External links 
 Profile Maastricht University
 Profile Google Scholar

References

1976 births
Living people
Dutch legal scholars
International law scholars
Academic staff of Maastricht University
People from Doetinchem
Rectors of universities in the Netherlands
Tilburg University alumni
Academic staff of Tilburg University
Victimology